The 1999 Bavarian Cup was the second edition of this competition which was started in 1998. It ended with the TSV 1860 Rosenheim winning the competition. Together with the finalist, SpVgg Landshut, both clubs were qualified for the DFB Cup 1999-00. 

The competition is open to all senior men's football teams playing within the Bavarian football league system and the Bavarian clubs in the Regionalliga Süd (III).

Rules & History
The seven Bezirke in Bavaria each play their own cup competition which in turn used to function as a qualifying to the German Cup (DFB-Pokal). Since 1998 these seven cup-winners plus the losing finalist of the region that won the previous event advance to the newly introduced Bavarian Cup, the Toto-Pokal. The two finalists of this competition advance to the German Cup. Bavarian clubs which play in the first or second Bundesliga are not permitted to take part in the event, their reserve teams however can. The seven regional cup winners were qualified for the first round.

Participating clubs
The following seven clubs qualified for the 1999 Bavarian Cup:

Bavarian Cup season 1998-99 
Teams qualified for the next round in bold.

Regional finals

First round

Semi-finals

Final

DFB Cup 1999-2000
The two clubs, TSV 1860 Rosenheim and SpVgg Landshut, who qualified through the Bavarian Cup for the DFB Cup 1999-00 both were knocked out in the second round of the national cup competition, having received a bye in the first round:

References

External links
 Bavarian FA website  

1999
Bavarian